Charles Smith (born December 20, 1951) is an American politician. He has served as a Republican member for the 3rd district in the Kansas House of Representatives since 2015. He currently works as a high school football coach.

References

1951 births
Living people
Republican Party members of the Kansas House of Representatives
21st-century American politicians
People from Atchison, Kansas
Pittsburg State University alumni